Westfall may refer to:

People with the surname
 Anne Westfall, game programmer
 Bob Westfall, American football player
 Buzz Westfall, American lawyer and politician
 Catherine Westfall, American historian of science
 Ed Westfall, hockey player
 Gary Westfall, American physicist and textbook author
 James Westfall, jazz vibraphonist
 Minter Jackson Westfall, American entomologist
 Morris Westfall, American politician
 Richard S. Westfall, American historian of science
 Stacy Westfall, horse trainer
 Steve Westfall (born 1955), American politician from West Virginia
 Thomas D. Westfall, American politician and FBI agent

Other uses
 Westfall, Kansas, an unincorporated community
 Westfall, Ohio, an unincorporated community
 Westfall, Oregon, an unincorporated community
 Westfall High School, a school in Williamsport, Ohio
 Westfall Township in Pike County, Pennsylvania
 Westfall Winery, a winery in New Jersey
 "Westfall", a song by Okkervil River on the album, Don't Fall in Love with Everyone You See

See also
Westphal (disambiguation)